BJ Burton is an American record producer, songwriter, engineer, and mixer. He is known for his work with Bon Iver, Francis and the Lights, Low, Charli XCX, and The Japanese House, and has also worked with the likes of Eminem, Lizzo and Mike Will Made It among others. 

Burton has been nominated for four Grammy Awards for his work with Bon Iver on their respective 22, A Million and i,i albums, Sylvan Esso on their album What Now, and Low on their album Hey What.

Career 

From 2010 to 2013, Burton performed and served production duties as a member of the Love Language; he produced their albums Libraries and Ruby Red.

Burton has worked extensively with Justin Vernon and Bon Iver. His collaborations with Vernon and Francis and the Lights have led to work with artists including Chance the Rapper, Eminem, Kanye West, Mike Will Made It, and more. Burton has also performed as a member of Bon Iver, on the Come Through tour in 2018.

Songwriting and production discography

References

Living people
Year of birth missing (living people)
Record producers from North Carolina
Songwriters from North Carolina